Kenneth William Tinegate (April 1915 – 18 July 1958) was an English rower who competed in the 1950 British Empire Games. During the 1950s, he was married to British Empire Games gold medalist diver Edna Child.

Career

Rowing
Tinegate had been associated with rowing since he was 17, having been a member of the Birmingham Rowing Club for over 20 years and winning "many trophies" in that time.
He represented England and won a bronze medal in the double sculls with Jack Brown at the 1950 British Empire Games in Auckland, New Zealand.

In June 1989, he had a boat named after him by Birmingham's Lord Mayor, Councillor Fred Chapman.

Outside rowing
He was employed at the Hockley timber merchants business, started by his father E. W. Tinegate. He was also a former captain of Kings Norton Rugby Club.

Personal life
During the Games in 1950 he lived at Oakfield Road, Selly Park, Birmingham and was a deputy manager. He was a member of the Birmingham Rowing Club.

On 16 October 1954, he married diver Edna Child, having met on the boat when sailing back home after the 1950 British Empire Games, where he stated his profession as a deputy manager. They spent their honeymoon in Italy. He died just under four years later on 18 July 1958 at Bromsgrove, leaving an estate worth just under £6,300 to Child, who survived him along with his two daughters.

References

1915 births
1958 deaths
Commonwealth Games bronze medallists for England
Commonwealth Games medallists in rowing
English male rowers
Rowers at the 1950 British Empire Games
Medallists at the 1950 British Empire Games